Cochrane was a provincial electoral district in Alberta mandated to return a single member to the Legislative Assembly of Alberta from 1909 to 1926 under the First Past the Post voting system and under Single Transferable Vote from 1926 to 1940.

History

Boundary history

Electoral history overview
The first election in the Cochrane provincial electoral was held in 1909. The district was created from an amalgamation of three electoral districts. Two of those districts, Rosebud and Banff, disappeared completely.

The election was a hotly contested race between two former members of the Legislative Assembly of the Northwest Territories: incumbent Charles Fisher and future Alberta Lieutenant Governor Robert Brett.

Fisher, who had been serving as the first Speaker of the House since 1906, was re-elected in the new district by a large margin. He held the district for 10 years before he died while still holding office, being re-elected twice more.

The by-election held in the district after Fisher's death saw the district won by Alexander Moore of the United Farmers of Alberta. Moore was re-elected in 1921, and served until 1926. Robert McCool was elected holding the district for the United Farmers. McCool was defeated by Social Credit candidate William King in the 1935 election which saw that party rise to power.

The electoral district was merged with the Rocky Mountain electoral district to become the new district of Banff-Cochrane for the 1940 Alberta general election.

Election results

1909 general election

1913 general election

1917 general election

1919 by-election
On May 5, 1919 incumbent Charles Fisher died, causing the district to become vacant. On July 15, 1919 the Alberta Non-Partisan League decided to merge with the United Farmers of Alberta.

The United Farmers held a nomination meeting on July 22, 1919. There were a total of three candidates running for the nomination. The meeting was well attended by the farmers in the area and the executive of the United Farmers of Alberta. The Chairman of the meeting was former Conservative candidate H.E.G.H. Scholefield. Alexander Moore was selected from a field of three nominees vying for candidacy.

The Liberals chose E.V. Thompson to hold the district, which had been a stronghold for the party. The returns came back showing a seesaw race. Thompson had won a number of polling divisions in towns, while Moore won the division's rural portions. The race was hotly contested and saw the largest voter turnout to date. The by-election would mark the beginning for the end of the Liberal government in Alberta.

1921 general election
The 1921 Alberta general election held in Cochrane saw another two-way fight. The election was contested by incumbent Alexander Moore who had won a historic by-election victory in the district just two years before.

The Liberals who had fought hard to keep the seat in the by-election hatched a plan to team up with the Conservatives. The two parties held a joint nomination meeting to run a candidate under both banners in the district. The party members nominated Angus McDonald, a popular rancher residing in the district, to oppose Moore and support the administration of Premier Charles Stewart.

The results came back as a landslide for Moore. He easily held his seat and kept the district for the United Farmers defeating Angus. The United Farmers would sweep many rural districts across the province that election to form the second Government of Alberta. Moore increased the percentage of the popular vote to almost 64%.

1926 general election

1930 general election

1935 general election

See also
List of Alberta provincial electoral districts
Cochrane, Alberta, a town in Southern Alberta

References

Further reading

External links
Elections Alberta
The Legislative Assembly of Alberta

Former provincial electoral districts of Alberta
1909 establishments in Alberta